José Alberto Márquez Àrdan (born 6 August 1988) is a Guatemalan footballer who plays for Liga Nacional club Guastatoya.

Personal life
Marquez suffered the loss of his mother, Tere Ardón, who passed away in August 2021.

Career
Marquez courted controversy in 2018 when Antigua GFC announced his signing on their website when his current team Guastatoya said he was still under contract. Ultimately, Marquez stayed with Guastatoya and signed a new 2 year contract with the club. He was a member of the Guastatoya side that won the Guatemalan title in 2018.

International career
He made his debut for the full Guatemalan team against Cuba on the 16 August 2018. He scored the opening goal of the game on his debut in a match Guatemala won 3-0. He was in the Guatemalan squad that competed at the 2021 CONCACAF Gold Cup.

Honours
Guastatoya
Liga Nacional de Guatemala: Clausura 2018, Apertura 2018, Apertura 2020

References

External links
 
 

1988 births
Living people
Guatemalan footballers
Guatemala international footballers
Association football midfielders
C.D. Guastatoya players
Liga Nacional de Fútbol de Guatemala players